Template Gothic is an experimental, sans-serif typeface designed by Barry Deck in 1989. It was not commercially released until type designer Rudy VanderLans was exposed to the font, when Deck's California Institute of the Arts graduate class visited his studio. In 1991, it was released by Emigre, a type foundry, of which VanderLans was a co-founder. In 1992, Deck developed a serif variation of the font. Template Gothic is considered one of the most defining fonts of the 1990s grunge aesthetic.

History 
Deck designed Template Gothic while studying at California Institute of the Arts under artist and graphic designer Edward Fella. Deck chose to eschew the predictability and uniformity of typefaces such as Helvetica and Univers, paying more attention to organic shapes and natural variations in order to create a more imperfect look.

In an interview with Emigre, Deck describes how he received the inspiration for Template Gothic from a sign in his local laundromat, which had been lettered by hand with a template.

Usage 
The font was used in posters and promotional material of the 1993 popular coming-of-age comedy film Dazed and Confused. It was also notably used on the posters and advertising material of other films such as 1994's Reality Bites and 1998's The Negotiator. 

It was also featured prominently in Issue #19 of Emigre, designed by Rudy VanderLans, in the cover art as well as inside the magazine.

It was also used in the logo for Top of the Pops from 1995 to 1998.

Template Gothic was one of the first digital typefaces acquired by the Museum of Modern Art for its Architecture and Design Collection in 2011. Along with twenty-two other fonts, it was displayed in MoMA's Standard Deviations exhibition from March 2011 to January 2012.

The cover for Radiohead's debut album Pablo Honey uses a slightly distorted form of Template Gothic, while the back cover uses it unedited.

The cover for Barenaked Ladies's 1998 Stunt uses a bolder version of Template Gothic.

References

External links 
 Template Gothic on BarryDeck.com

Typefaces and fonts introduced in 1991
Sans-serif typefaces